is a former Japanese football player. She played for the Japan national team.

National team career
Hara was born on August 18, 1988. On March 29, 2005, when she was 16 years old, she debuted for the Japan national team against Australia.

National team statistics

References

1988 births
Living people
Japanese women's footballers
Japan women's international footballers
Women's association football forwards